61 Garpar Lane is a Bengali social drama film directed by Rajesh Dutta, Ipsita Roy sarkar and produced by Abhishek De Sarkar. This film was released on 17 February 2017 under the banner of Actor Studio. Nachiketa Chakraborty is the music director of the movie.

Plot
Eight tenants with their families live in an age old house of Jagadish Ghosh in Kolkata. Jagadish's only daughter Jhinuk is married with an engineer, Supratik and lives in Chandannagar. One day Supratik decides to sell the old property to a promoter Mr. Bajoria for handful of money. Facing the crisis those families join hands.

Cast
 Soumitra Chatterjee as Late Jagadish
 Priyanshu Chatterjee as Supratik
 Manoj Mitra as Minu's father
 Chandrayee Ghosh as Minu
 Nachiketa Chakraborty in a special appearance
Kharaj Mukherjee
 Sujan Mukhopadhyay
 Sudipta Chakraborty
 Chitra Sen
 Pushpita Mukhopadhyay
 Rajshree Rajbanshi as Jhinuk
Anirban Guha as Minu's fiancé
 Ratan Sarkhel
Sancharee Mukherjee
 Sumit Samaddar

References

External links
 

2017 films
Bengali-language Indian films
2010s Bengali-language films
Indian drama films
2017 drama films